The Little Wicomico River is a  river in the United States state of Virginia.  The river, mostly tidal, flows into Chesapeake Bay at the junction of the south shore of the Potomac River, which is also the Maryland-Virginia boundary, with Chesapeake Bay.

See also
List of rivers of Virginia

References

USGS Hydrologic Unit Map - State of Virginia (1974)

Rivers of Virginia
Rivers of Northumberland County, Virginia